Luke Lamar Short (January22, 1854September8, 1893) was an American Old West gunfighter, cowboy, U.S. Army scout, dispatch rider, gambler, boxing promoter, and saloon owner. He survived numerous gunfights, the most famous of which were against Charlie Storms in Tombstone, Arizona Territory and against Jim Courtright in Fort Worth, Texas. Short had business interests in three of the best-known saloons in the Old West: the Oriental in Tombstone, the Long Branch Saloon in Dodge City, and the White Elephant in Fort Worth.

Early life
Short was born in Polk County, Arkansas, in January 1854. He was the fifth child of Josiah Washington Short (February2, 1812February8, 1890) and his wife Hetty Brumley (February2, 1826November30, 1908). Short had nine siblings. The family soon moved to Montague County, Texas.

In 1862, Luke Short witnessed first-hand his father's being ambushed and attacked by Comanches in their yard. His father was surrounded by the Indians, who wounded him with arrows and lances. Inside the house, Luke, who was a little boy at that time, helped the elder Short by dragging a large rifle to his brother, who then ran and handed it to his father. At the age of 13, Luke was said to have carved the face of a bully when he was still at school, which was a reason why he and his father moved to Fort Worth.

In 1869, at age 15, Short started work as a cowboy, which he continued through 1875, and during which he made several trips to the Kansas railheads.

Short was reported by Bat Masterson to have killed six drunken Sioux Indians at various times. Later writers have relied on Masterson's story as truthful and added to it, but no documentation of these killings has been found. Nonetheless, Short had been in over 30 engagements fighting Indians while working for the government. His first Indian fight was in 1869. While working as a scout for General George Crook in 1876, he was stationed in the Black Hills during the Sioux insurrection. While conducting one of his usual scouting expeditions for the army, a band of 15 Indians suddenly ambushed and fired at him with rifles. Short managed to draw his pistols and fired back, killing three of them in quick succession. Some of the Indians gave chase on horseback, and Short killed two of them before finally reaching safety.

From October6 to8, 1878, Short worked as a dispatch courier from Ogallala for Major Thomas Tipton Thornburgh; Short earned $30 (about $ in ). He then served as a civilian scout for Thornburgh until October20. He enlisted at Sidney, Nebraska to be paid $100 a month (around $ today) but he only served for 12days, for which he was paid $40. The Fort Worth Daily Gazette later described him as "the bravest scout in the government employ."

In an interview later in his life, Short told researcher George H. Morrison that he moved to the Black Hills in 1876 and to Ogallala, Nebraska, the next year. Accounts written in Short's later years stated that he was an outlaw during his time in Nebraska. Around this time, Short was said to have traded whiskey with Indians around Camp Robinson, Nebraska. According to his nephew Wayne Short, Luke was arrested by the army. They put him to a train destined for Omaha, but Luke managed to escape the army escort and went to the makeshift mining and cowtown of Denver, Colorado, taking up gambling as a profession. He is said to have killed two men on separate occasions due to altercations during their card games.

Gambling days
Short moved to Leadville, Colorado, in 1879, where he continued gambling. Bat Masterson later wrote that Short seriously wounded a man during a gambling dispute in Leadville. He was accused of swindling Texan John Jones "out of $280 on Three Card Monte"  and jailed on October 5 for six days in Kansas City.

Gunfight with Charlie Storms
Short first met Wyatt Earp, William H. Harris, and Bat Masterson in Tombstone. Based on their previous friendship, Harris had no problem convincing his partners to engage Earp as a faro dealer at their Oriental Saloon in Tombstone. On Friday, February25, 1881, Short was serving as the lookout, seated next to the dealer at a faro game in the Oriental, when he was involved in what became a well-known gunfight. His opponent was Charlie Storms. Bat Masterson, who was in Tombstone at the time, described what happened in a magazine article he wrote in 1907:

Storms' body was taken to the undertaker, where the coroner's jury was convened and testimony was heard. The jury reached a verdict that Storms died from three pistol wounds at the hands of Short, and that Short's actions were justifiable. Short was free to go, as no further legal action was taken.

Five days after Storms died, the Leadville Democrat wrote about the shooting. It said that Storms approached Short and "catching him by the ear", demanded an apology. According to the account, Storms grabbed Short's ear with his left hand and his right hand contained a pistol aimed at Short. Short drew his weapon and shot Storms, who returned fire, but missed. Short then put two more bullets into "the sinking soul of Storms."

Dodge City

Short left Tombstone in early 1881, arriving in Dodge City in April 1881. He remained in Dodge City until the final months of 1883, although he made frequent trips to pursue gambling opportunities. During February 1883, Chalk Beeson sold his interest in the Long Branch to Short. In March, Harris was nominated to run for mayor of Dodge City. Within a few days, on March19, a "law and order" group nominated Lawrence E. Deger to run against Harris. Deger defeated Harris by214 votes to 43 in the election of April3. All five of the city council candidates running with Deger were also elected.

On April23, the Dodge City Council posted two ordinances that were immediately approved by Mayor Deger. Ordinance No.70 was "An Ordinance for the Suppression of Vice and Immorality Within the City of Dodge City." Ordinance No.71 was "An Ordinance to Define and Punish Vagrancy." Reports of that time recorded an event where Short beat a man with a pistol, which resulted with the man being bedridden and "in despair" for several days. On April 28, three prostitutes employed at the Long Branch were arrested by City Marshal Jack Bridges and policeman Louis C. Hartman. Soon afterward, Short and Hartman exchanged gunfire. Neither man was hurt. Short was quickly arrested and released on $2,000 bond. His preliminary examination was set for May2.

Forced out of town
On April30, Short was again arrested (along with five other gamblers) and placed in jail. The following day, Short and the five others were escorted to the train depot and given their choice of east- or west-bound trains. Short went east to Kansas City, Missouri, where he looked up Charles E. Bassett at the Marble Hall Saloon. Bassett and Short had a lot in common, and both had at different times owned an interest in the Long Branch Saloon.

Short and Bassett, along with William F. Petillon, began conceiving a plan to get Short back to Dodge City. Short went to Topeka, the capital, on May 10, where he presented a petition to Governor George W. Glick. Short returned to Kansas City and was joined there by Bat Masterson. Wyatt Earp arrived in Dodge City, along with several gunfighters, on May31. Short, Earp, and Petillon met in Kinsley, Kansas, on June3, 1883, and took the afternoon train to Dodge City. Deger issued a proclamation the following day ordering the closing of all gambling places in Dodge City.

Dodge City Peace Commission

Deger's action came during the cattle season and promised ruin for the seasonal boom, and economics, rather than bloodshed, resolved the "Dodge City War". Additional pressure to resolve the issue had come from the governor and the Santa Fe Railroad, which did considerable business in the town. The gambling halls, dance halls, and saloons, including the Long Branch, were ordered to be reopened. On June9, both sides met in a dance hall that opened that night and resolved their differences. The following day, eight men gathered and posed for a widely reproduced Wild West history photo. The group was dubbed the Dodge City Peace Commission. The men in the historic photo were William H. Harris, Luke Short, Bat Masterson, William F. Petillon, Charles E. Bassett, Wyatt Earp, Michael Francis "Frank" McLean, and Cornelius "Neil" Brown. Shortly after the photo was taken, Bat Masterson and Wyatt Earp departed on a westbound train for Colorado.

The Long Branch Saloon had reopened, and the "Dodge City War" had ended without a shot being fired, but Short decided to move on. On November19, 1883, Short and Harris sold the Long Branch to Roy Drake and Frank Warren. Short moved to San Antonio, Texas, for a brief time before relocating to Fort Worth.

Fort Worth

Partnership in White Elephant Saloon

In December 1884, Jacob Christopher "Jake" Johnson, Short, and James A. "Alex" Reddick became the new owners of the Fort Worth White Elephant Saloon. Jake Johnson was one of the wealthiest men in Texas, and his part ownership of the White Elephant was just one of his many business and real estate enterprises. As a co-owner, Short did not deal cards, but had card dealers working for him. On May9, 1885, in what became a routine element of doing business, Short, Jake Johnson, and M.F. "Frank" McLean and three others pleaded guilty and were each fined $25 for "gaming."

Also, around this time in Forth Worth, Short did one of his amazing acts of marksmanship. While dining in a restaurant, the waiter handed him a glass of milk that had a small fly on the surface. Short calmly threw his milk in the air, jerked his gun out, and shot the fly.

Sporting pursuits
Bat Masterson was a boxing enthusiast and tried to interest Short in the sport. At first, Short was indifferent, but by June28, 1885, he found himself acting as the "third man in the ring" when he was called upon to referee a match fought near Weatherford, Texas, between the 6-foot-2-inch "Kid Bridges" and the 5-foot-8-inch "St. Joe Kid". The decision of referee Short was that the "St. Joe Kid" won on a foul.

Jake Johnson was responsible for making horse racing a major part of Short's sporting agenda. Johnson and two partners opened the Fort Worth Driving Park in January 1885. Short bought his own race horse named Tobe, along with some jockey silks for himself, and drove his two-wheeled sulky in a race held on November13, 1886. Short and Tobe came in last in a field of five.

Selling his interest in the White Elephant
In 1887, Short's younger brother, Henry Jenkins Short, killed a man named Charles T. Schuyler at San Angelo, Texas, on January23. San Angelo, 200miles southwest of Fort Worth, was the town where Short's parents and other family members lived. Initial reports indicated that Schuyler was shot twice, the bullets entering his back and coming out at the front, either one of which would have been fatal. Henry Short fled to Fort Worth, before he could be arrested, to enlist the aid and funds that his brother Luke could provide for his defense. Luke and Henry returned to San Angelo on January29, and Henry voluntarily surrendered to the sheriff and gave bond for his appearance in the district court.

The money that would be needed to defend Henry Short would have to be provided by Luke, who had already put up the money for Henry's bond. In addition, Luke had at the time some unrelated but very expensive legal problems of his own looming in the Dallas court. The amount that would be needed to handle all of these legal issues was more than Luke had on hand. To raise the needed funds, Johnson agreed to purchase Luke Short's one-third interest in the White Elephant on February7, 1887. Jake Johnson was an assured source for the kind of cash Short needed and had no interest in again being a partner in the White Elephant, but Short needed help, so Johnson agreed to buy Short's share. The press informed the public that Short had no intention of leaving town, "but will continue to call Fort Worth home."

Duel with Jim Courtright

On the night of February8, 1887, another argument broke out between Luke Short and Jim Courtright about the latter's persistence in demanding money from Luke's establishment for "protection". An infuriated Courtright stormed from the saloon, but later returned with two pistols visibly holstered in his pockets. He yelled for Luke Short to come out, but Jake Johnson, a friend of both men, tried to calm Courtright down. Short met with the two men outside and talked about their dispute as they walked through the street. The group, however, suddenly stopped at Ella Blackwell's Shooting Gallery. Luke Short was facing Courtright three to four feet away when the latter suddenly went for his pistol, making the former draw his own in return. In the celebrated gunfight that followed, Short was the last man standing. In his own words, Short described what happened:

The showdown was also witnessed by Bat Masterson, who was with Luke Short at the time. In 1907, Masterson published his own account of the events, where he stated that Jim Courtright, carrying a "brace of pistols", challenged Luke Short to a duel:

Investigations of the gunfight concluded that while  Courtright went for his pistol first, Short ultimately outdrew and killed him. Courtright's inability to fire off a shot was due to a number of possible reasons; one was that his pistol broke when one of Short's bullets struck it and his thumb, or that his pistol got caught on his watch chain for a second as he drew it, which Western historian DeArment considered to be unlikely or a "feeble excuse".

The gunfight became well known due to the notoriety of both men. Courtright's funeral was attended by hundreds of Fort Worth residents. Short was arrested for the shooting, and though he was almost lynched after the shootout, he was never brought to trial. Finally, Short was able to settle his legal problems with the court in Dallas. All of the cases against him were dismissed with no explanation.

Marriage to Hattie Buck
Following the resolution of his legal problems, Short was now financially stable. He traveled to Kansas, where he married Hattie Buck (born October5, 1863) in Oswego, Kansas, on March15, 1887. Harriet Beatrice Buck was born in Coles County, Illinois, on October5, 1863. She was the fourth of eight children born between 1858 and 1878. Buck's family later moved to Emporia, Kansas, where her father died a few years prior to her marriage. Short and his wife went to Fort Worth shortly after their wedding, but soon boarded a train "for a brief stay in Hot Springs." A.G. Arkwright later recalled, "Luke Short came there, to the hotel where I was staying, with his wife, the beautiful and accomplished daughter of an Emporia banker, whom he married under romantic circumstances."

Horse racing and the Palais Royal
"Doing the racing circuit" was a large part of Short's career as a sporting man. His friend Jake Johnson and he, along with their wives, attended the inaugural running of the Futurity Stakes on Labor Day 1888. That event was held in New York at the Sheepshead Bay Race Track on Coney Island. By October 1888, Short and Johnson were back in Fort Worth. Short was no longer connected with the White Elephant, and Johnson had decided to open what the local paper headlined as a "super resort" called the Palais Royal, which was designed to rival the White Elephant. Short may have been part owner, but if so, remained a silent partner.

Chicago

Boxing promoter
Short spent part of each year, from 1889 until 1893, in Chicago. He usually went there during the summer to get relief from the Texas heat and to attend Thoroughbred horse races. Hattie always went with him. By the end of 1889, Chicago was well aware who Short was. The Daily Inter Ocean reported that Short, "who is numbered as one of the prominent figures of the Richburg battle" had cabled Charles E. "Parson" Davies offering $20,000 to have John L. Sullivan defend his title in a championship fight at Fort Worth.

On February8, 1890, Short's father, Josiah Washington Short, died in San Angelo, Texas, "at the ripe age of 78years", although Short only learned of his father's death after the burial. Soon thereafter, Short's youngest brother, William B. Short, was killed at the age of 22 "by a herd of stampeding cattle on the Tankersly ranch."

Robbed
The Shorts were on the move during most of what remained of 1890. Short, Johnson, and  a gambler named Charles M. Wright, along with other sporting men, were partners in some Memphis faro games. The partners won significant amounts of cash, reported as "thousands of dollars", which were entrusted to Wright. He was designated as the banker for the group and was supposed to place the winnings in a hotel safe where the group stayed. For some reason, Wright decided to keep the cash in his hotel room, and was robbed of the entire amount. Wright wanted Short and his other partners to bear an equal share of the loss, but they refused and turned the matter over to the authorities, who decided against Wright. According to a later report, Wright was never satisfied with that decision, and had "hard words with several of his ex-partners on the subject since that time, particularly with Short."

The racing circuit
Following the racing circuit occupied much of Short's time during the late spring and early summer of 1890. The presence of the Shorts at Saratoga Springs, New York, was reported in the local press. While he had enormous success at racetracks across the country, boxing promotion remained an unattainable goal for Short. He was destined to be remembered for gunfights rather than prize fights.

The last gunfight
The long-simmering feud between Short and Wright finally reached the boiling point in Fort Worth on December23, 1890. The gunfight took place at the Bank Saloon on Main Street that was owned by Wright. In testimonies presented by eyewitnesses, Wright was conducting gambling in his house and Short went there to close it down. After Short got all the patrons evicted at gunpoint, Wright suddenly ambushed him with a shotgun, wounding Short in the left hip and leg, as well as injuring his left hand. Short retaliated by drawing his pistol and shooting Wright in the right wrist, disarming him. Both men then sluggishly separated ways, with Short going out to meet his friends, while Wright stayed in the building clutching his wound.

In describing Short's leg wound, the local paper said, "the full charge of buckshot passed through the flesh, making a tunnel, the muscles on the outside were torn out." The wound on his left hand resulted in his thumb being "taken off at the joint." Reports of the shooting, along with updates on Short's condition, were published in newspapers in several states. A paper in Hutchinson, Kansas, observed, "his wounds are enough to kill a common man, but Luke may get well." Short remained bedridden for months. In 1891, a Chicago newspaper published a lengthy profile of Short. When discussing the gunfight with Wright, the paper reported: "It was supposed at the time that Short was fatally wounded, and his recovery was wholly due to the careful nursing of his wife, who for three months hardly left his bed side." Both Short and Wright were indicted and charged with assault with intent to murder. Both men made bonds without trouble in the sum of $1,000. The trial date was changed more than once, and a final decision was not reached until March1, 1892.

Nearly killing a man by mistake in Chicago
While awaiting his trial date, Short was free to come and go as he pleased. He was feeling well enough by May21, 1891, to board a train for Chicago with Johnson, accompanied by his wife. The racing season was about to begin, and Johnson and Short both owned a string of horses that would be running at Washington Park Race Track in Chicago.

Short was accosted in the lobby of the Leland Hotel by a drunken attorney named JamesJ. Singleton during late October 1891. According to the report, Short did not have his pistol, but managed to give Singleton a few kicks, which knocked him down, and then Short picked him up, and pushed him out "into the frosty night air." Short went upstairs for his gun in case Singleton decided to return. While Short was gone, an actor named WilliamF. Hoey (1854–1897) walked into the hotel lobby. The actor turned out to resemble closely the lawyer Short had just kicked out. Short saw Hoey, thought he was Singleton, and charged at him with his pistol. A quick-thinking hotel clerk named Ed Kennedy jumped between the two men and prevented a homicide. When Short realized his mistake, he apologized to the actor and treated him to drinks and a late supper.

Guilty of assault
On March1, 1892, a decision was reached in the Statev Luke Short. Short was found guilty of aggravated assault against Charles Wright, and a fine of $150 was assessed against him.

Final days

Bright's disease
By the start of 1893,  something apparently was seriously wrong with Short's health. Doctors determined that he was suffering from one of the kidney diseases that then went under the now-obsolete classification of Bright's disease. These diseases are described in modern medicine as acute or chronic nephritis. Edema, then called "dropsy", would have contributed to a slight puffiness in his face, as well as the accumulation of fluids in his lower legs that would have made standing difficult for prolonged periods of time for Short. Short was in Fort Worth when a Kansas newspaper reported that he was "lying at death's door." Short and a number of friends, and with Hattie beside him, took the north-bound Santa Fe train for Geuda Springs, Kansas. The place offered a change of climate and the medicinal qualities of the famous waters, which, hopefully, would "prolong his life." The move did not have the desired effect.

Death
Short died at the Gilbert House in Geuda Springs on September8, 1893. The local paper reported: "Luke Short died at the Gilbert this morning of dropsy." Just two days before Short's death, while Hattie sat at his bedside in Kansas, word arrived that her mother had died in Fort Worth. A Dodge City newspaper belatedly printed a dispatch from Fort Worth that stated, "two days ago, his mother-in-law died and the two funerals will take place here at the same time." Hattie found herself a widow at29 years old. Short was39  at the time of his death.

Short's funeral took place in Fort Worth on September10, 1893. Carriages in a line more than a mile long followed Short's body to Oakwood Cemetery in Fort Worth. Short had purchased a gravestone shortly before his death. It is a plain, upright marker simply inscribed: L. L. SHORT  1854– 1893.

In popular culture
On February22, 1955, Short was played by actor Wally Cassell in an episode of the syndicated Western TV series Stories of the Century. The part of Jim Courtright was portrayed by actor Robert Knapp (1924–2001).

On January5, 1960, Bob Steele played Short in the episode "The Terrified Town" on the CBS Western television series The Texan, starring Rory Calhoun.

Notes

References

Further reading
 Cox, William R. Luke Short and His Era: A Biography of One of the Old West's Most Famous Gamblers, Garden City, NY: Doubleday & Co., 1961.
 DeMattos, Jack. "Gunfighters of the Real West: Luke Short," Real West, December 1982.
 DeMattos, Jack. "The Dodge City Peace Commission Revealed," Wild West History Association Journal, (Vol. VI, No. 2), April 2013.
 DeMattos, Jack and Parsons, Chuck. The Notorious Luke Short: Sporting Man of the Wild West, Denton, TX: University of North Texas Press, 2015 
 Masterson, W.B. (Bat). "Famous Gun Fighters of the Western Frontier: Luke Short," Human Life Magazine (Vol. 5, No. 1), April 1907.
 Masterson, W.B. (Bat) The 75th Anniversary Edition of Famous Gun Fighters of the Western Frontier (Annotated and Illustrated by Jack DeMattos), Monroe, WA: Weatherford Press, 1982 
 Miller, Nyle H., and Snell, Joseph W. Why the West Was Wild. Topeka: Kansas State Historical Society, 1963.
 Ryall, William. "The Luck of Luke," True Western Adventures, April 1961.
 Short, Wayne. Luke Short: A Biography of one of the Old West's Most Colorful Gamblers and Gunfighters, Tombstone, AZ: Devil's Thumb Press, 1997. 
 Walker, Wayne T. "Killer in Fancy Pants," True West, October 1956.

1854 births
1893 deaths
American duellists
American Old West articles needing attention
Businesspeople from Texas
Cochise County conflict
Cowboys
Deaths from edema
Drinking establishment owners
Gunslingers of the American Old West
People from Polk County, Arkansas
Saloonkeepers
19th-century American businesspeople